Utah Wagon Train is a 1951 American Western film directed by Philip Ford, written by John K. Butler, and starring Rex Allen, Penny Edwards, Buddy Ebsen, Roy Barcroft, Sarah Padden and Grant Withers. It was released on October 15, 1951, by Republic Pictures.

Plot

Cast
Rex Allen as Rex Allen
Koko as Koko
Penny Edwards as Nancy Bonner
Buddy Ebsen as Snooper
Roy Barcroft as Henchman Hank Driscoll
Sarah Padden as Sarah Wendover
Grant Withers as Red Bancroft
Arthur Space as Robert Hatfield
Edwin Rand as Jess Sutton
Robert Karnes as Henchman Jack Scully
William Holmes as Henchman Pete Millan 
Stanley Andrews as Sheriff 
Frank Jenks as Hap
Al Bridge as Sam Sickle
Forrest Taylor as Cyrus Bonner
Louis Mason as Hotel Clerk
Peggy Walker as Mrs. Emily Sutton
Adrienne Marden as Mrs. Belle Hatfield

References

External links 
 

1951 films
American Western (genre) films
1951 Western (genre) films
Republic Pictures films
Films directed by Philip Ford
American black-and-white films
1950s English-language films
1950s American films